Evan Brandon John (born January 5, 1995) is a Canadian professional soccer player who plays as a centre-back for Atlético Ottawa.

Club career

Early career
In 2012, John played with SC Toronto in the Canadian Soccer League. He was part of the Toronto FC Academy program before joining German club FC Erzgebirge Aue where he played for their under-23 team.

Seattle Sounders FC 2
On April 29, 2016, he signed with USL club Seattle Sounders FC 2.  He made his debut for the club two days later in a 1–1 draw against Oklahoma City Energy. In August 2016, John announced that he had torn his ACL and would be out for the rest of the 2016 season. He made a total of nine appearances that year.

Vaughan Azzurri
In 2017, John played for League1 Ontario side Vaughan Azzurri, making twelve league appearances.

SIMA Águilas
In 2018, John played for American USL League Two side SIMA Águilas, making eight appearances.

Orlando City B
On February 20, 2019, John signed with USL League One side Orlando City B. That season, he made ten league appearances, scoring one goal.

Atlético Ottawa
On March 23, 2020, John signed with Canadian Premier League side Atlético Ottawa. He made his debut in Ottawa's inaugural match on August 15 against York9.

International career
John represented Canada at the 2015 CONCACAF U-20 Championship. In May 2016, John was called to Canada's U23 national team for a pair of friendlies against Guyana and Grenada. He saw action in both matches.
John was invited to his first Men's National team camp in August 2017 as the team was preparing for a friendly against Jamaica.

References

External links
 
 
 
 

1995 births
Living people
Association football defenders
Canadian soccer players
Saint Vincent and the Grenadines footballers
Soccer players from Toronto
Sportspeople from Scarborough, Toronto
People from Kingstown
Saint Vincent and the Grenadines emigrants to Canada
Naturalized citizens of Canada
Canadian expatriate soccer players
Saint Vincent and the Grenadines expatriate footballers
Expatriate footballers in Germany
Canadian expatriate sportspeople in Germany
Saint Vincent and the Grenadines expatriate sportspeople in Germany
Expatriate soccer players in the United States
Canadian expatriate sportspeople in the United States
Saint Vincent and the Grenadines expatriate sportspeople in the United States
SC Toronto players
Toronto FC players
FC Erzgebirge Aue players
Tacoma Defiance players
SIMA Águilas players
Orlando City B players
Atlético Ottawa players
Canadian Soccer League (1998–present) players
Oberliga (football) players
USL Championship players
League1 Ontario players
USL League Two players
USL League One players
Canadian Premier League players
Canada men's youth international soccer players
Canada men's under-23 international soccer players
2015 CONCACAF U-20 Championship players
Vaughan Azzurri players